Keith Andrew Tonge (born 6 November 1964) is an English retired professional footballer who played in the Football League for Brentford as a midfielder.

Career 
Tonge began his career in the youth team at Tottenham Hotspur, before transferring to the youth team at Third Division club Brentford. He made one professional appearance for the Bees, when he replaced Paul Walker during a 4–1 league defeat to Reading on 27 January 1982. He was offered a professional contract in November 1982, but was released at the end of the 1982–83 season. Tongue later played for Isthmian League Premier Division club Leytonstone/Ilford.

Career statistics

References

1964 births
Living people
English footballers
Footballers from Edmonton, London
Tottenham Hotspur F.C. players
Brentford F.C. players
English Football League players
Isthmian League players
Redbridge Forest F.C. players
Association football midfielders